Lucignolo is a 1999 Italian film.

Lucignolo may also refer to:

 Candlewick (character), a character from the book The Adventures of Pinocchio.
 Lucignolo (beetle), a genus of leaf beetles named after the above character.